The JW Marriott Grand Rapids is a hotel located in downtown Grand Rapids, Michigan. It was the first JW Marriott Hotel in the Midwest and is the sixth tallest building in Grand Rapids. Its theme is based on Grand Rapids's sister cities: Omihachiman, Japan; Bielsko-Biala, Poland; Perugia, Italy; Ga District, Ghana; and Zapopan, Mexico. When the hotel was first opened, Amway Hotel Corporation hired photographer Dan Watts to travel to each of the sister cities and photograph them for the property. Each floor of the hotel features photography from one of the cities and is unique to that floor.

The property was identified as the brand's best hotel for customer service in North America for 2008, 2009, and 2014.

References

External links 
 Marriott's Corporate Hotel Page
 Building Statistics from the Pennsylvania State University

JW Marriott Hotels
Skyscraper hotels in Michigan
Buildings and structures in Grand Rapids, Michigan
Skyscrapers in Grand Rapids, Michigan